Volunteer Jam: The Movie is a DVD by American musician Charlie Daniels. Daniels has a series of concerts and albums titled Volunteer Jam. It is a concert film from the second Volunteer Jam and is called 'The First Full-Length Southern Rock Motion Picture'. It was shot in 1975. It was released on DVD on September 4, 2007.

DVD
Scene Index
 Intro (3:05)
 Whiskey (6:46)
 Birmingham Blues (5:58)
 Long Haired Country Boy (5:27)
 No Place To Go (19:44)
 Funky Junky (5:10)
 Texas (3:10)
 The South's Gonna Do It (Again) (4:28)
 Orange Blossom Special (6:14)
 Twenty-Four Hours (10:10)
 The Thrill Is Gone (11:22)
 Jelly, Jelly Blues (11:13)
 Sweet Mama (4:15)
 Mountain Dew (5:56)

External links 
 http://www.cduniverse.com/productinfo.asp?pid=7484690
 http://video.barnesandnoble.com/DVD/Charlie-Daniels-Band-Volunteer-Jam/Charlie-Daniels-Band/e/801213915897#TABS

2007 video albums
Charlie Daniels albums